Adam Drewnowski (born 1948 in Warsaw, Poland) is a professor of epidemiology at the University of Washington and the director of the Center for Public Health Nutrition at the University's School of Public Health.
Son of an economics professor Jan Drewnowski.

Education
Drewnowski received his MA from Oxford University (1971) and PhD from Rockefeller University in psychology (1977).

Scientific career
After postdoctoral work at the University of Toronto, Drewnowski became an assistant professor at Rockefeller University, then a professor of public health and Director of the Program in Human Nutrition at the School of Public Health at the University of Michigan. While there he researched a possible drug to block cravings for chocolate, since these cravings usually precipitate eating binges. He joined the University of Washington in 1998.

In 2008, Drewnowski led the development of the Nutrient Rich Foods Index, which ranks foods based on their nutrient density. He has also studied the relationship between poverty and being more likely to become obese, and the relationship between the per-calorie price of food and the amount of key nutrients they contain.

References

1948 births
Living people
University of Washington faculty
American food scientists
Alumni of the University of Oxford
Rockefeller University alumni
University of Michigan faculty
American epidemiologists
Polish emigrants to the United States